The 1960–61 season was the 72nd season of competitive football played by Ipswich Town. They finished the season as champions of the Second Division, one point ahead of second-placed Sheffield United, winning promotion to the top flight of English football for the first time in their history. Ray Crawford was the league's top scorer with 40 goals and his strike partner Ted Phillips netted 30 times as Ipswich scored exactly 100 league goals.

Players
Players who made one appearance or more for Ipswich Town F.C. during the 1960–61 season

League standings

Results
Home team listed first

Division Two

League Cup

FA Cup

References

Ipswich Town F.C. seasons
Ipswich Town